Pervomayskoye is a rural locality (a selo) in Kosyakinsky Selsoviet, Kizlyarsky District, Republic of Dagestan, Russia. The population was 945 as of 2010. There are 9 streets.

Geography 
Pervomayskoye is located 10 km north of Kizlyar (the district's administrative centre) by road. Vperyod and Kosyakino are the nearest rural localities.

Nationalities 
Dargins, Avars, Tabasarans, Laks and Russians live there.

References 

Rural localities in Kizlyarsky District